Nancy C. Riley (born June 20, 1958) represented Oklahoma State Senate District 37 which is located in Tulsa County and includes Bixby, Jenks, Lotsee, Tulsa and Sand Springs from 2000 to 2008. Riley grew up in Tulsa and graduated from Edison High School. She attended Oklahoma Christian College for three years, then married and started a family. Riley's first husband died from a brain tumor. During that time, Riley was forced to live on food stamps. She later graduated from Langston University, and began teaching elementary school in the Tulsa Public Schools system.

Early life
Nancy C. Riley was born in Tulsa, Oklahoma on June 20, 1958. She graduated from Edison High School in 1976. Until she married, Riley lived in the same house her entire life. Riley was the youngest of four children, with her oldest brother being twenty years her senior.

State Senate
Riley was elected as a Republican in 2000 and re-elected in 2004 still as a Republican. In 2006 Riley ran for the office of Lt. Governor as a Republican where she came in third and received 41,984 votes or 23.46%. Her showing was strong enough to force a runoff between House Speaker Todd Hiett and Senator Scott Pruitt.

Following the July 25 primary Riley surprised everyone when she announced that she was switching parties to become a Democrat. Before she switched parties the Democrats had a slim one seat margin in the Senate, illustrating the importance of her move. She felt that moderates like herself were no longer relevant in the Republican Party, although many say personality conflicts with the Party were more important.

In April 2007 GOP Senate leader Glenn Coffee saw defeating Riley as the top priority in 2008. Democrats have made it a top priority to retain Riley. Riley said after the 2007 legislative session that she feels more independent in the Democratic caucus, and can vote her own way rather than the party line. Riley served as Democratic Whip, Co-Chair of the Appropriations Subcommittee on Human Services, and on the Appropriation, Education, Transportation, and Retirement and Insurance committees.

On Tuesday, November 4, 2008, Senator Riley's bid for a third term in the state Senate ended when she was defeated in the general election by the Republican candidate, Tulsa businessman Dan Newberry.

Election results

General Election November 4, 2008

General Election November 7, 2004

General Election November 2, 2000

References

External links
 Follow the Money – Nancy Riley
 2008 2006 2004 2000 State Senate campaign contributions
 2006 Lt. Governor campaign contributions
 Women of the Oklahoma Legislature Oral History Project -- OSU Library

American educators
Langston University alumni
Politicians from Tulsa, Oklahoma
1958 births
Living people
Women state legislators in Oklahoma
Democratic Party Oklahoma state senators
Republican Party Oklahoma state senators
21st-century American politicians
21st-century American women politicians
Tulsa Public Schools teachers